Club Bàsquet Puig d'en Valls, popularly known as  Bàsquet PDV and also known as Palacio de Congresos de Ibiza for sponsorship reasons, is a Spanish women's basketball club from Santa Eulària des Riu, Ibiza.

History
Founded in 1996, it played in the LFB between 2003 and 2012, when it was relegated to the Liga de Baloncesto de Ibiza.

Puig d'en Valls qualified for the championship play-offs in 2003, 2005 and 2008; in the latter it was 3rd, its best result in the regular season. In addition it reached the 2009 Copa de la Reina's final, lost to Ros Casares, and played the FIBA Eurocup in 2004, 2009 and 2010. On the other hand, this last season saw PDV ending last in the table, but it was spared from relegation by buying Real Canoe's spot. The team improved the following year, but it was finally relegated in 2012. Following the withdrawal of Joventut Mariana and Celta de Vigo in June Puig d'en Valls was offered a spot in the LFB, but the club turned down the offer due to financial strain.

Season by season

Trophies
Copa de la Reina:
Runner-up: 2009
Supercopa:
Runner-up: 2009

References

External links
Official website

Women's basketball teams in Spain
Basketball teams established in 1996
Santa Eulària des Riu
Sport in Ibiza
Basketball teams in the Balearic Islands
1996 establishments in Spain